The Alfred Kerr Preis (Alfred Kerr Prize) for literary criticism is an annual award funded by the journal of the German Book Trade.

The prize commemorates the theatre, literary critic and journalist Alfred Kerr (1867–1948) and is endowed with 5,000 euros each year. Since 1996 the prize has been given to an individual for their work in literary criticism, and since 2004 has taken place at the Leipzig Book Fair.

The jury consists of Prof Klaus Reichert (Honorary President of the German Academy for Language and Literature), Dr. Maria Gazzetti (Manager of the Poetic Literature Foundation ), Peter Härtling (author), Klaus Schöffling (publisher), Torsten Casimir (financial newspaper chief), and Michael Lemling (Managing Director of the Munich bookstore Lehmkuhl).

Award winners 
Source:

 1978: Jürgen Lodemann
 1982: Otto Breicha
 1988: Dieter P. Meier-Lenz
 1992: Volker Ullrich
 1993: Werner Liersch
 1996: Hanns Grössel
 1997: Paul Ingendaay
 1998: Günther Ohnemus
 1999: Andreas Nentwich
 2000: Lothar Müller
 2001: Ulrich Weinzierl
 2002: Maike Albath
 2003: Felicitas von Lovenberg
 2004: Elmar Krekeler
 2005: Hubert Spiegel
 2006: Meike Feßmann
 2007: Hubert Winkels
 2008: Burkhard Müller
 2009: Gregor Dotzauer
 2010: Dorothea von Törne
 2011: Ina Hartwig
 2012: Helmut Böttiger
 2013: Daniela Strigl
 2014: Insa Wilke
 2015: Manfred Papst
 2016: Nico Bleutge
 2017: Andreas Breitenstein
 2018: 
 2019: 
 2020: Christian Metz
 2021:

References

External links
 

German non-fiction literary awards
1978 establishments in Germany
Awards established in 1978